Aadukalam is a 2011 Indian Tamil-language drama film written and directed by Vetrimaaran and produced by S. Kathiresan. Vetrimaaran co-wrote the dialogues with Vikram Sugumaran. The film stars Dhanush and Taapsee Pannu with Kishore, V. I. S. Jayapalan, Naren, and Murugadoss playing supporting roles. The musical score was composed by G. V. Prakash Kumar while the cinematography and editing were respectively handled by Velraj and Kishore Te. The film's story revolves around Karuppu who is the understudy of an experienced cockfighter, Pettaikaran. When Karuppu wins in a cockfight against Pettaikaran's rival Rathnasamy, Pettaikaran, who is initially happy, becomes jealous of Karuppu's newfound popularity and plots his downfall.

Produced on a budget of 150-200 million, Aadukalam was released on 14 January 2011 and grossed 300 million according to a February 2011 report by The Economic Times. The film garnered awards and nominations in several categories, with particular praise for its direction, screenplay, Dhanush's performance, music, cinematography, and editing. The film has won 33 awards from 52 nominations.

Aadukalam won six awards at the 58th National Film Awards ceremony, thereby sharing the record with Kannathil Muthamittal (2002) for the most number of National Film Awards won by a Tamil film. It won awards under the Best Direction (Vetrimaaran), Best Actor (Dhanush), Best Screenplay (Original) (Vetrimaaran), Best Editing (Kishore Te) and Best Choreography (Dinesh Kumar) categories with a Special Jury Award being presented to V. I. S Jayapalan. The film was nominated in seven categories at the 59th Filmfare Awards South, winning Best Film – Tamil (S. Kathiresan), Best Director – Tamil, Best Actor – Tamil, Best Music Director – Tamil (G. V. Prakash Kumar), and Best Cinematographer (Velraj). At the 6th Vijay Awards, it was nominated in twenty-two categories and won in five, including Entertainer of the Year, Best Director and Best Music Director. Among other wins, the film received seven Ananda Vikatan Cinema Awards, four South Indian International Movie Awards, three Mirchi Music Awards, and one Norway Tamil Film Festival Award, Chennai International Film Festival Award, and Chennai Times Film Award each.

Awards and nominations

See also 
 List of Tamil films of 2011

Notes

References

External links 
 Accolades for Aadukalam at the Internet Movie Database

Aadukalam